Elaine Unterhalter  (born 1952) is a South African educational researcher. She is Professor of Education and International Development at University College London. Unterhalter was elected as Fellow of the British Academy in 2020. She is a Fellow of the Human Development and Capability Association.

References

External links

1952 births
Living people
Fellows of the British Academy
University of the Witwatersrand alumni
Academics of University College London
Educational researchers